Turgay Hilmi (born in Cyprus
) is a Turkish Cypriot French horn player. He is a former member of the Staatstheater Nürnberg and associate professor of music at the Friedrich Alexander University, in Erlangen and Nuremberg, Germany. Hilmi is also the Honorary Representative for cultural affairs of the Turkish Republic of Northern Cyprus in Germany. He is also the general manager of Cyprus Art Music and Ballet School.

References

Turkish-language singers
Turkish Cypriot musicians
Living people
Year of birth missing (living people)